Cuban Pete may refer to one of the following:

Cuban Pete, a 1946 film starring Desi Arnaz and The King Sisters
Cuban Pete, the nickname of the Mambo dancer Pedro Aguilar (1927–2009)
"Cuban Pete", a song performed by Mantovani & His Tipica Orchestra (1936) and Louis Armstrong (1937) and was used as opening theme for the MGM film Saturday Night at the Trocedero (1937) among others, and popularized by Desi Arnaz (1946)